The 1950 SEC men's basketball tournament took place March 2–4, 1950 in Louisville, Kentucky at the Jefferson County Armory.

The Wildcats would play in the 12-team 1950 National Invitation Tournament, losing to eventual champion CCNY in the second round. No SEC teams played in the 8-team 1950 NCAA tournament.

Bracket

 = denotes overtime game

References

SEC men's basketball tournament
1949–50 Southeastern Conference men's basketball season
Basketball in Kentucky
SEC Basket